Jean Durtal, real name Marie-Charlotte Sandberg-Charpentier (16 February 1905 - 27 June 1999) was a 20th-century French poet, novelist, and woman of letters.

She was also a journalist and directed the journal Les Temps Modernes ans was a member and then president of the Société des gens de lettres.

Literary prizes 
Jean Durtal was awarded several literary prizes by the Académie française:
1971: Chants pour Athanaël, Prix François Coppée (poetry prize established in 1907)
1974: Livre blanc, Prix Émile Hinzelin (poetry prize established in 1945) 
1979: Les raisins de septembre, Prix Broquette-Gonin (literary prize established in 1910)

Bibliography 
1946: Le Héros, preface by Pierre Dejussieu-Pontcarral, cowritten with Jean Durtal and Pierre-Marie-Philippe Dejussieu, Éditions Gutenberg, Paris
1949: La peau des autres, Éditions L'Elan
1951: Je suis gueri, Éditions : L'Elan
1954: Le Voile de Béatrice, Angers 
1957: L'Homme au pilori, Les éditions ludographiques françaises, Nice
1960: Le Chef d'orchestre : Poèmes, Les éditions ludographiques françaises, Nice 
1966: Les coulisses de la politique. une femme témoigne 1932-1942, 
1970: Saïd Akl, Poète Libanais, Nouvelles Éditions Latines
1971: Chants pour Athanaël, Éditions Dar al kitab, Beyrouth
1972: Les Raisins de septembre, Nouvelles Éditions Latines
1973: Livre blanc, Nouvelles Éditions Latines
1975: Choix de textes de Jean Durtal, essais... bibliographie, documents cowritten with Jean Durtal,  and Pierre Silvain, Collection Poètes actuels, Éditions Actuelles Formes et langages
1980: Place Du Ralliement, Éditions Val De Loire Angers 
1986: La Fontaine du soir, Éditions Firmin-Didot 
Le trottoir des veuves Nouvelles Éditions Latines
Rue de la Sagesse, Nouvelles Éditions Latines, reprint 2008

References

External links 
 Jean Durtal on the site of the Académie française

Winners of the Prix Broquette-Gonin (literature)
French women novelists
French women journalists
20th-century French poets
People from Angers
1905 births
1999 deaths
20th-century French women writers